Gymnoscelis ischnophylla is a moth in the family Geometridae. It was described by Alfred Jefferis Turner in 1942. It is found in Australia (Queensland).

Taxonomy
The species belongs to a species complex clustered around Gymnoscelis imparatalis.

References

Moths described in 1942
ischnophylla